Yegen House and Pioneer Grocery, in Bismarck, North Dakota, was listed on the National Register of Historic Places. It was built in 1874. The owner John Yegen was an immigrant from Switzerland. The listing, in 1977, included three contributing buildings. The site was delisted in 2011, due to the house being demolished and the Grocery being relocated to the Missouri Valley Fairgrounds in 1993.

References

Houses on the National Register of Historic Places in North Dakota
Houses completed in 1874
Houses in Bismarck, North Dakota
Swiss-American history
Commercial buildings on the National Register of Historic Places in North Dakota
National Register of Historic Places in Bismarck, North Dakota
Grocery store buildings